Minford, Ohio, is census-designated place located in Ohio.

Minford may also refer to:

 Patrick Minford, British macroeconomist
 John Minford, sinologist and literary translator
 Nat Minford, Unionist politician in Northern Ireland
 Minford High School, rural, public, high school located in Minford, Ohio